The NP Kunta Ultra Mega Solar Park, also known as Ananthapuram - I Ultra Mega Solar Park or Kadiri Ultra Mega Solar Park, is a solar park occupying a total area of  in Nambulapulakunta mandal of Kadiri Constituency in  Kadiri Division of Sri Sathya Sai district of the Indian state of Andhra Pradesh it is 35 km away from Kadiri.

The first phase of the park was commissioned on 9 May 2016 with a capacity of 200 MW. An additional 50 MW capacity was commissioned on 29 July 2016. A further 750 MW was planned to have been commissioned by March 2018 in the second phase.

This was the largest solar project commissioned using domestically manufactured solar cells and modules at the time.

In May 2018, Azure Power commissioned a 50 MW solar capacity at the park. In July 2018, Tata Power commissioned another 100 MW capacity, taking total commissioned capacity to 500 MW.

In July 2018, 750 MW were awarded for installation at 2.71/kW⋅h.

As of 30 April 2021, 978.5 MW capacity was commissioned by the following companies: Sprng Agnitra (250 MW), Ayana Solar (228.5 MW), SB Energy Solar (250 MW) and NTPC (250 MW). Another 400 MW was installed by Tatas (100 MW), ACME (150 MW), Azure (50 MW) and FRV Ltd (100 MW) at adjacent Galiveedu Solar Park which is not part of NP Kunta Solar Park.

See also

 Power sector of Andhra Pradesh
 Kadapa Ultra Mega Solar Park
 Kurnool Ultra Mega Solar Park

References 

Photovoltaic power stations in India
2016 establishments in Andhra Pradesh
Anantapur district
Power stations in Andhra Pradesh
Energy infrastructure completed in 2016